Saaristattus is a monotypic genus of Malaysian jumping spiders containing the single species, Saaristattus tropicus. It was first described by D. V. Logunov & G. N. Azarkina in 2008, and is found only in Malaysia. The name is a combination of Michael Saaristo and attus, a common suffix for salticid genera, meaning "jumper". The species name means "tropical".

References

Invertebrates of Malaysia
Monotypic Salticidae genera
Salticidae
Spiders of Asia